("House on the River") is an Art Deco house built in 1936 to a Spanish theme, on the banks of the river Yealm at Newton Ferrers, South Hams, Devon, England.

Once owned by the Berkertex family, the house was commissioned by the baker Walter Price, who had visited California in the 1920s, to research the bread trade there, and had met Douglas Fairbanks and Mary Pickford at their house, Pickfair, which served as Price's inspiration.

The house's features include a marble staircase made to look like a piano keyboard, and an outdoor swimming pool, since filled in and grassed over. The exterior is white stucco. A basement bar, pool room and cinema have been added in modern times, in the former garage.

, the house was available to rent as a holiday residence sleeping 20. The former servants' quarters are now a separate, ten-bedroom family home. In 2013, a full episode of the BBC programme "Art Deco Icons", presented by David Heathcote, featured the house.

References

External links 
 Art Deco Icons episode

Houses in Devon
South Hams
Houses completed in 1936
History of Devon
Art Deco architecture in England